Stade Aimé Giral is a multi-purpose stadium in Perpignan, France. It is currently used mostly for rugby union matches and is the home stadium of USA Perpignan.

History
The stadium also hosted the majority of Catalans Dragons home matches in the rugby league club's first two seasons in the Super League in 2006 and 2007. The Dragons have since renovated their own ground, Stade Gilbert Brutus, and now play all their home matches there. The stadium has been expanded from a capacity of 13,500 to 14,593 in a project that ended in 2008.

The stadium has the name of early club fly-half Aimé Giral, who died during the First World War. Seven USA Perpignan players died during this war.

Rugby League Test matches
List of rugby league test matches played at Stade Aimé Giral.

See also

List of rugby league stadiums by capacity

References

External links

Rugby union stadiums in France
Rugby league stadiums in France
USA Perpignan
Multi-purpose stadiums in France
Sports venues in Pyrénées-Orientales
Sport in Perpignan
Sports venues completed in 1940
Catalans Dragons